Justin Outten (born October 26, 1983) is an American football coach who is the running backs coach and run game coordinator for the Tennessee Titans of the National Football League (NFL). He previously served an assistant coach for the Atlanta Falcons and Green Bay Packers and was the offensive coordinator for the Denver Broncos in 2022. Outten played college football as a center at Syracuse University.

Early years
A native of Doylestown, Pennsylvania, Outten attended and played high school football as a center at Central Bucks High School West. Outten was a two-year starter at center for the Syracuse Orange during the coaching transition from Paul Pasqualoni to Greg Robinson, from 2003-06.

Coaching career

Syracuse
In 2007, Outten began his coaching career at his alma mater, Syracuse University, as a graduate assistant.

Westfield HS
In 2008, Outten was hired to become Offensive Line Coach at Westfield High School in Houston, Texas. He later added titles of assistant head coach and offensive coordinator at the school.

Atlanta Falcons
In 2016, Outten joined the Atlanta Falcons as a coaching intern. In 2017, he was hired by the Falcons as an offensive assistant under head coach Dan Quinn.

Green Bay Packers
On January 24, 2019, Outten was hired by the Green Bay Packers as their tight ends coach under head coach Matt LaFleur.

On December 12, 2021, Outten missed the Packers' Week 14 game against the Chicago Bears due to COVID-19 protocols.

Denver Broncos
On February 2, 2022, Outten was hired by the Denver Broncos as their offensive coordinator under head coach Nathaniel Hackett.

References

External links
 Syracuse Orange profile

1983 births
Living people
American football centers
Atlanta Falcons coaches
Denver Broncos coaches
Green Bay Packers coaches
National Football League offensive coordinators
People from Doylestown, Pennsylvania
Players of American football from Pennsylvania
Syracuse Orange football coaches
Syracuse Orange football players